Sir William (Alfred) Waterlow, 1st Baronet, KBE JP,  (23 April 1871 - 6 July 1931), was 602nd Lord Mayor of London.

Waterlow was educated at Marlborough College. He rose to become Managing Director of Waterlow and Sons and was knighted Knight Commander of the Order of the British Empire (KBE) in the 1919 New Year Honours. He became Alderman for Cornhill Ward and was elected a Sheriff of the City of London for 1928–29 and Lord Mayor of London for 1929–30. He was created a baronet, of Harrow Weald, on 28 October 1930.

He is best known for his involvement in the Portuguese Bank Note Crisis (1925) a fraud masterminded by Alves dos Reis.

References

1871 births
1931 deaths
People educated at Marlborough College
Knights Commander of the Order of the British Empire
Sheriffs of the City of London
20th-century lord mayors of London
20th-century English politicians
Baronets in the Baronetage of the United Kingdom